Charles M. McClain was a delegate to the Oklahoma Constitutional Convention in 1906. McClain County, Oklahoma is named in honor of him.

References

Constitution of Oklahoma
McClain County, Oklahoma
20th-century American politicians